Glare is the first album by Irish musician Leo O'Kelly. It was originally planned for October 2000 but was released on 2 February 2001 in Ireland by Clarinda & 1st and distributed by Gael-Linn Records.

Track listing

Release history

References

2001 debut albums
Leo O'Kelly albums